These are the official results of the Women's Individual Time Trial at the 1996 Summer Olympics in Atlanta, Georgia. There were a total number of 25 participants, with one non-starter, in this inaugural Olympic event over 26 kilometres, held on Saturday August 3, 1996.

Final classification

See also
 1995 UCI Road World Championships - Women's Time Trial

References

External links
 Official Report

Road cycling at the 1996 Summer Olympics
Cycling at the Summer Olympics – Women's individual time trial
Olym
Cyc